Myles Spencer Peart-Harris (born 19 September 2002) is an English professional footballer who plays as an attacking midfielder for  club Forest Green Rovers, on loan from  club Brentford.

Peart-Harris is a graduate of the Chelsea Academy and transferred to Brentford in 2021. He was capped by England at U16 level.

Club career

Chelsea 
Peart-Harris began his youth career with Bedfont Green, before moving into the Chelsea Academy at the age of eight. He began his career as a winger, before moving to centre back at U12 level and then being developed into an attacking midfielder. Peart-Harris progressed to sign a scholarship deal at the end of the 2018–19 season and signed a professional contract in September 2019. He progressed to the Development Squad and finished the 2020–21 season as the team's joint-top scorer. Peart-Harris departed Cobham in July 2021.

Brentford 
On 23 July 2021, Peart-Harris transferred to Premier League club Brentford and signed a four-year contract, with the option of a further year, for an undisclosed fee, reported to be £1.4 million. Named as a substitute in 8 matchday squads during the 2021–22 season, Peart-Harris made two appearances in cup matches. He was a part of the B team's 2021–22 London Senior Cup-winning squad.

Well down the midfield pecking order following the 2022–23 pre-season, Peart-Harris joined League One club Forest Green Rovers on loan until January 2023. Following 25 appearances and four goals during the first half of the 2022–23 season, Peart-Harris' loan was extended until the end of the campaign. In the absence of captain Baily Cargill, Peart-Harris took the armband for a league match versus Ipswich Town on 18 February 2023, which was lost 4–0.

International career 
Peart-Harris won five caps for England at U16 level during the 2017–18 season. He was an unused substitute during England's three 2019 European U17 Championship elite round qualifying matches in March 2019, but was not named in the squad for the tournament finals. Peart-Harris was called into an U19 training camp in November 2020.

Style of play 
Peart-Harris has been described as "a dynamic midfield player and he drives forward with the ball. He has great quality on the ball. He can score goals and deliver assists. He is great at arriving in the penalty area at the right time".

Career statistics

Honours 
Brentford B

 London Senior Cup: 2021–22

References

External links 

 
 Myles Peart-Harris at brentfordfc.com

Living people
English footballers
Brentford F.C. players
Black British sportspeople
2002 births
Association football midfielders
People from Isleworth
England youth international footballers
Forest Green Rovers F.C. players
English Football League players